Mauritania national under-20 football team (Arabic: منتخب موريتانيا الوطني لكرة القدم تحت 20 سنة), represents Mauritania in association football at an under-20 age level and is controlled by the Football Federation of the Islamic Republic of Mauritania, the governing body for football in Mauritania.

Achievements
UNAF U-20 Tournament
Runners-up (1): 2012

Tournament Records

FIFA U-20 World Cup record

Africa U-20 Cup of Nations record

WAFU U-20 Championship record

Arab Cup U-20 Record

Current squad 
The following players were called up for the 2021 UNAF U-20 Tournament.

References

External links
Team profile - soccerway.com

under-20
African national under-20 association football teams